Jane Byrd McCall Whitehead (1858–1955) was an American artist, photographer and aesthete.

She was born in 1858 in Philadelphia to Jane Byrd Mercer and Peter McCall. Her father was a lawyer, and a former mayor of Philadelphia. She studied art with John Ruskin at the Academie Julian in Paris, and in 1886 while travelling with her parents through Europe, she was presented to Queen Victoria. In 1892 she married Ralph Radcliffe Whitehead. With her husband, she founded Byrdcliffe, an arts and crafts colony that opened in 1903. In 2004, her work was the subject of a one-person show, Jane Byrd McCall Whitehead's (1861-1955) Idealized Visions About Simple Living and the Arts and Crafts, at the Georgia Museum of Art. As an aesthete, her work and sensibilities "demonstrate how the visual and aesthetic qualities of artistic living and the "simple" life evolved throughout [her] lifetime."

Whitehead's work is included in the collection of the Smithsonian American Art Museum and the Layton Art Collection of the Milwaukee Museum of Art.

References

19th-century American women artists
20th-century American women artists
1858 births
1955 deaths
Artists from Philadelphia